The Palazzo Porto Colleoni Thiene, also called a Villa or Castello, is a prominent palace structure in the town center of Thiene.

The castle has two lateral battlement or tower-like corners, with merlonated roof edges. It was completed by 1476 in the late-gothic style of land palaces in the Veneto, including the tall columns and ogival windows on the piano nobile. The initial architect was Domenico da Venezia, but the work was completed by Giovanni da Porta. The interior is frescoed by  Giovanni Antonio Fasolo and Giovanni Battista Zelotti.

Sources
City site

Gallery of Frescoed Interiors

Palaces in Veneto
Houses completed in the 15th century
Thiene